The men's 100 metres event at the 1990 World Junior Championships in Athletics was held in Plovdiv, Bulgaria, at Deveti Septemvri Stadium on 8 and 9 August.

Medalists

Results

Final
9 August
Wind: +0.6 m/s

Semifinals
9 August

Semifinal 1
Wind: +2.1 m/s

Semifinal 2
Wind: +0.7 m/s

Quarterfinals
8 August

Quarterfinal 1
Wind: -2.1 m/s

Quarterfinal 2
Wind: -1.4 m/s

Quarterfinal 3
Wind: +0.5 m/s

Quarterfinal 4
Wind: -1.8 m/s

Heats
8 August

Heat 1
Wind: -1.0 m/s

Heat 2
Wind: +2.0 m/s

Heat 3
Wind: -0.1 m/s

Heat 4
Wind: -0.9 m/s

Heat 5
Wind: -0.2 m/s

Heat 6
Wind: +0.7 m/s

Heat 7
Wind: +0.4 m/s

Participation
According to an unofficial count, 55 athletes from 38 countries participated in the event.

References

100 metres
100 metres at the World Athletics U20 Championships